Over Drive was a professional wrestling event produced by Impact Wrestling. It took place on November 18, 2022, at Old Forester's Paristown Hall in Louisville, Kentucky, and aired on Impact Plus and YouTube. The event also featured wrestlers from partner promotions Lucha Libre AAA Worldwide (AAA) and New Japan Pro-Wrestling (NJPW).

Ten matches were contested at the event, including two on the pre-show and one taped as a digital exclusive. In the main event, Josh Alexander defeated Frankie Kazarian to retain the Impact World Championship. In other prominent matches, Jordynne Grace defeated Masha Slamovich in a Last Knockout Standing match to retain the Impact Knockouts World Championship, Trey Miguel defeated Black Taurus to win the vacant Impact X Division Championship, Mickie James defeated Taylor Wilde in a Career Threatening match, and Bully Ray defeated Moose in a Tables match in the opening bout.

Production

Background 
On July 18, 2022, Impact Wrestling announced that Over Drive would take place on November 18, 2022, at Old Forester's Paristown Hall in Louisville, Kentucky.

Storylines 
The event featured several professional wrestling matches that involved different wrestlers from pre-existing scripted feuds and storylines. Wrestlers portrayed villains, heroes, or less distinguishable characters in scripted events that build tension and culminate in a wrestling match or series of matches. Storylines were produced on Impact's weekly television program.

On the October 13 episode of Impact!, after Josh Alexander successfully defended the Impact World Championship against Bobby Fish, X Division Champion Frankie Kazarian invoked Option C, vacating the X Division Championship the following week for a world title match at Over Drive.

As a result of Frankie Kazarian invoking Option C, an eight-man tournament was organized to crown a new X Division Champion, with the finals set to take place at Over Drive. Black Taurus, Trey Miguel, PJ Black, and Mike Bailey advanced to the semifinals by defeating Laredo Kid, Alan Angels, Yuya Uemura, and Kenny King, respectively. Miguel advanced to the final by defeating Bailey via disqualification after King threw the former into the ring steps, and Taurus advanced to the final by defeating Black.

On the October 20 episode of Impact!, Heath and Rhino won the Impact World Tag Team Championship by defeating The Kingdom (Matt Taven and Mike Bennett). The following week, The Motor City Machine Guns (Alex Shelley and Chris Sabin), who lost to The Kingdom at Bound for Glory, looked to gain another title match from the new champions. However, The Major Players (Brian Myers and Matt Cardona) also wanted a shot, so Shelley and Cardona faced off in singles competition later that night. There, Cardona picked up the win after Myers hit Shelley with the Impact Digital Media Championship belt. This win earned The Major Players a tag team title match against Heath and Rhino at Over Drive.

At Bound for Glory, The Death Dollz (Jessicka and Taya Valkyrie) (accompanied by Rosemary) defeated the Knockouts World Tag Team Champions VXT (Chelsea Green and Deonna Purrazzo) to win the titles. On the November 3 episode of Impact!, Jessicka answered an open challenge to face Savannah Evans, which was offered by Evan's ally Tasha Steelz, but was unsuccessful. Following Jessicka's loss, it was confirmed that Evans and Steelz would challenge The Death Dollz for their title.

At Bound for Glory, Bully Ray returned to Impact in the Call Your Shot Gauntlet, last eliminating Steve Maclin to win a championship match of his choosing at any time. Later in the night, after Josh Alexander retained the Impact World Championship against Eddie Edwards, Honor No More attacked Alexander from behind, appearing to let Ray invoke his title match right then and there. However, Ray instead helped Alexander fend off Honor No More to close out the show. On the subsequent episode of Impact!, Ray explained to Alexander that, due to his checkered past in Impact as someone who will do anything to get what he wants, he wants to use his opportunity the right way in order to preserve his legacy. However, many questioned Ray's true motives, including Moose, who called Ray nothing but a "scumbag". On the October 20 episode of Impact!, Ace Austin was attacked in the parking garage before a tag team match with Chris Bey against Ray and Tommy Dreamer, leading to more suspicion being put on Ray. The following week, Ray tried to explain that he was not the culprit, and arbitrarily blamed Moose for the attack. Later, Moose came out during a match between Dreamer and Bey, with Ray in Dreamer's corner. There, Moose swept Bey's legs and walked off, making it seem that Ray had committed the act instead. On November 4, Impact announced that Ray and Moose will meet one-on-one at Over Drive. On the November 10 episode of Impact!, after Ray defeated Zicky Dice, Moose would deliver a low blow to Ray before spearing him through a table. As such, their match would later turn into a tables match.

At Bound for Glory, Taylor Wilde made her return to Impact in the Call Your Shot Gauntlet, where she was eliminated 12th by Matt Cardona. On the October 20 episode of Impact!, after Wilde defeated Mia Yim, Wilde was welcomed back by Mickie James, who is in her final run before retiring (dubbed "The Last Rodeo".) Before James could challenge Wilde to a match, both were attacked by VXT (Chelsea Green and Deonna Purrazzo) and Gisele Shaw up until the Knockouts World Champion Jordynne Grace made the save. This led into a six-woman tag team match between all involved on the following episode of Impact!, which Grace, James, and Wilde were victorious. On the November 10 episode of Impact!, after James defeated Green, Impact confirmed that James would face Wilde at Over Drive.

At Bound for Glory, Jordynne Grace successfully defended the Impact Knockouts World Championship against Masha Slamovich, breaking the latter's undefeated streak. Several weeks later on the November 10 episode of Impact!, Grace defended the title against Gisele Shaw. After the match, Slamovich returned and attacked Grace on the entrance ramp with steel chairs. On November 14, Impact announced that Grace will once again defend the title against Slamovich in a Last Knockout Standing match.

Results

Impact X Division Championship Tournament

Notes

References

External links 
 

2022 Impact Plus Monthly Special events
2022 in professional wrestling
2022 in Kentucky
Events in Louisville, Kentucky
Professional wrestling in Kentucky
November 2022 events in the United States